Elof Jan Connman was a goalkeeper in the Swedish football club IFK Norrköping. He was born in October 26, 1942.

Jan also made an appearance in the Swedish movie The Unthinkable, in which he portrayed himself.

References
http://www.hitta.se/jan+connman/kolm%C3%A5rden/person/xTR2wvHqqb
http://www.iksleipner.se/iksleipner/sida/30782/lagbilder-1970-1979
http://www.gruvstugan.com/malisar.htm
http://pro.se/Distrikt/Ostergotland/Samorganisationer/Norrkoping/Foreningar/PRO-Kvarsebo/Om-Foreningen/Styrelsen/
http://www.fotbollsweden.se/Allsve%201967.htm
http://www.aik.se/fotboll/ar/1967/19671008.html

1942 births
Swedish footballers
Living people
Association football goalkeepers